Bent Creek is an unincorporated community in Yancey County, North Carolina, United States.

Geography

References

Unincorporated communities in North Carolina
Unincorporated communities in Yancey County, North Carolina